John Edward Crowther Ltd is a British textile and real estate company headquartered in Marsden, West Yorkshire, and incorporated in the United Kingdom. It was historically an important producer of woollen cloth in Marsden, West Yorkshire, England. Its premises at Bank Bottom Mill reached its heyday in the late nineteenth and early twentieth centuries under the ownership of the Crowther family, in particular John Edward Crowther, a businessman and philanthropist. However, the cloth industry declined in the late twentieth century, and production of woollen cloth finally ceased in 2003.

History
Business boomed during the 1914-18 war, thanks to the huge demand for woollen cloth needed to clothe men in uniform. King George V and Queen Mary visited the company's mills on 30 May 1918, as a mark of appreciation of the contribution it was making to the continued war effort.

The business was run by John Edward Crowther, a businessman and philanthropist who made a number of charitable donations to the village and people of Marsden. In 1931 the economic downturn caused by the Great Depression caused the mill to work short time, and on 4 July 1931 Crowther took his own life.

Decline and closure
By the late 20th and early 21st century the Yorkshire textile industry had fallen on hard times, and Bank Bottom Mill closed in 2003, with the loss of 275 jobs.

Notes

Further reading
Armstrong, Thomas; The Crowthers of Bankdam, HarperCollins (1991).  
 Marsden History Group, Marsden - Then and Now: A Photographic Journey, 
 Pearson, Irene E., Marsden Through the Ages, (1984),

External links
 John Edward Crowther Ltd at Companies House Retrieved 18 February 2019
 Factories Inquiry Commission Volume 2; Supplementary Report of the Central Board of Her Majesty's Commissioners Appointed to Collect Information in the Manufacturing, as to the Employment of Children in Factories, and as to the Propriety and Means of Curtailing their Labour (1834) Retrieved 4 January 2014
 Marsden Local History Group web site. Retrieved 31 December 2013
 "Picture of the Week: John Crowther mill memories in the shadow of the moors", Huddersfield Daily Examiner, 24 May 2012. Retrieved 31 December 2013
 Pearson, Irene E., Marsden Through the Ages, (1984),  Retrieved 4 January 2014

Companies based in Kirklees
Textile companies of the United Kingdom
Manufacturing companies established in the 19th century